The Kaldygaity is a river in the West Kazakhstan Region, Kazakhstan.

The Kaldygaity belongs to the Ural basin. The banks of the river are a seasonal grazing ground for local cattle.

Course 
The Kaldygaity has its sources in the southwestern slopes of Mount Almastau. It heads first southwestwards across Shyngyrlau District, then it bends westwards and flows in that direction through Karatobe District. It forms meanders in a floodplain until it meets the wide salt lake area that lies near Tolen village.

The main ones are the Peschanaya, Bayanas and Ashchysay. The river valley is wide and in its middle and lower course the Kaldygaity flows across sandy terrain. It is fed by snow and rain. On years of heavy snow its lower stretch floods.

Fauna 
The main fish species in the Kaldygaity include pike, Eurasian carp, perch and karabalik. The European pond turtle is also found in the river.
The reed undergrowth of the lower reaches of the Kaldygaity and neighboring Olenti provides a habitat and a mass-breeding place for the Asian locust.

See also
List of rivers of Kazakhstan

References

External links 

Rivers of the West Kazakhstan region.

Rivers of Kazakhstan
West Kazakhstan Region
Endorheic basins of Asia
Ural basin
Caspian Depression